Aborolabis is a genus of earwigs in the subfamily Anisolabidinae. It was cited by Srivastava in Part 2 of Fauna of India.

Species
The genus includes the following species:

 Aborolabis angulifera
 Aborolabis cerrobarjai
 Aborolabis emarginata
 Aborolabis kalaktangensis
 Aborolabis martensi
 Aborolabis mauritanica
 Aborolabis mordax
 Aborolabis nepalensis
 Aborolabis nigrescens
 Aborolabis pervicina
 Aborolabis rufocapitata
 Aborolabis tanzanica
 Aborolabis vicina

References

External links
 The Earwig Research Centre's Aborolabis database Source for references: type Aborolabis in the "genus" field and click "search".

Anisolabididae
Arthropods of Asia
Dermaptera genera